Hamiltonganj railway station is the railway station which serves the areas of Hamiltonganj, Kalchini, Hasimara and Jaigaon lying on Doars region in the Indian state of West Bengal. It lies in the New Jalpaiguri–Alipurduar–Samuktala Road line of Northeast Frontier Railway zone, Alipurduar railway division.

Trains
Major trains running from Hamiltonganj Railway Station are as follows:

Sealdah-Alipurduar Kanchan Kanya Express
Siliguri–Alipurduar Intercity Express

References

Railway stations in West Bengal
Alipurduar railway division
Railway stations in Alipurduar district